I’m All Wrapped Up in You is a studio album by American country music singer Don Gibson copyrighted by ABC Records and issued under the DJM Records and Tapes label in 1976 in the UK. It was noted to be a Hickory Recording, recorded in Nashville. The tracks on the album were produced between 1972 and 1976 by Hickory Records.

Track listing

AllMusic lists the tracks as:

"I'm All Wrapped Up in You" (Don Gibson)
"World Is Waiting for the Sunrise" (Eugene Lockhart, Ernest Seitz)
"Doin' My Time" (Jimmie Skinner)
"When You Got Love" (Don Gibson)
"Once I Find My Way" (Don Gibson)
"It's All Over" (Don Everly)
"Bring Back Your Love to Me" (Don Gibson)
"We Live in Two Different Worlds" (Fred Rose)
"I'd Be a Legend in My Time" (Don Gibson)
"Bringin' in the Georgia Mail" (Don Gibson)

UK track listing

All tracks written by Don Gibson except where indicated.

"I’m All Wrapped Up in You”
"I Wish Her Well (There She Goes)"
"Doin’ My Time” (Jimmie Skinner)
"Funny Familiar Forgotten Feelings" (Mickey Newbury)
"When You Got Love"
"Once I Find My Way"
"It’s All Over" (Don Everly)
"Bring Back Your Love to Me"
"We Live in Two Different Worlds"
"(I’d Be) A Legend in My Time"
"Just One Time"
"Bringin’ in the Georgia Mail"

Musicians

Adapted from the liner notes of the UK release:

Dale Sellers - lead guitar (Tracks 1, 3, 12)
Marvin Lanier - acoustic guitar (Tracks 1, 3, 12)
Earl M. Erb - guitar (Tracks 1, 3, 12)
Russell E. Hicks - steel guitar (Tracks 1, 3, 12)
Terry Lee McMillan - harmonica (Tracks 1, 3, 12)
Thomas B. Keels - piano (Tracks 1, 3, 12)
Bobby Dyson - bass (Tracks 1, 2, 3, 5, 6, 7, 8, 11, 12)
John A. Stacey - drums (Tracks 1, 2, 12)
Harold Ray Bradley - guitar (Tracks 2, 4, 8, 9, 11)
Thomas Grady Martin - guitar (Tracks 2, 4, 5, 6, 7, 8, 9, 10, 11)
Jerry Stembridge (Chip Young) - (Tracks 2, 4, 8, 9, 10, 11)
Pete Drake - steel guitar (Tracks 2, 4, 5, 6, 7, 8, 9, 11)
Hargus "Pig" Robbins - piano (Tracks 2, 4, 5, 6, 7, 8, 9, 10, 11)
Murrey M. Harman Jr. - drums (Tracks 2, 4, 8, 9, 1, 11)
Robert C. Thompson - acoustic guitar (Tracks 5, 6, 7)
Leon Rhodes - six-string bass (Tracks 5, 6, 7)
A. Kenneth Buttrey - drums (Tracks 5, 6, 7)
Bob L. Moore - bass (Track 9)
Jerry Shook - guitar (Track 10)
Harold L. Chalker - steel (Track 10)
Roy M. Huskey Jr. - bass (Track 10)

Backing vocals

Adapted from the liner notes of the UK release:

Leajane Berinati (Tracks 1, 3, 12)
Ginger Holliday (Tracks 1, 3, 12)
Janie Fricke (Tracks 1, 3, 12)
Hoyt H. Hawkins (Track 2, 8, 9, 10)
Neal Matthews Jr. (Track 2, 4, 8, 9, 10, 11)
Raymond C. Walker (Tracks 2, 4, 8, 9, 10, 11)
Hugh G. Stoker (Track 4, 9, 10, 11)
Ernest Duane West (Track 4, 11)
Dorothy A. Dillard (Tracks 5, 6, 7)
Jeanine O. Walker (Tracks 5, 6, 7)
William G. Wright (Tracks 5, 6, 7)
Louis D. Nunley (Tracks 5, 6, 7)
Allen M. Henson (Track 8)

Production

Adapted from the liner notes of the UK release:

Produced by Wesley Rose
Mastered at Woodland Sound Studios, Nashville, Tennessee.
Mastering Engineer: Denny Purcell
Album photography and hand tinting: Dennis Carney & Bonnie Schiffman
Album art direction: Frank Mulvey
Album design: Kathy Mashburn

References

1976 albums
Albums produced by Wesley Rose
Don Gibson albums